This is a list of Bangladeshi films that was released in 2011.

January–March

April–June

July–September

October–December

See also 

List of Bangladeshi films of 2012
List of Bangladeshi films
Cinema of Bangladesh

References

Film
Lists of 2011 films by country or language
 2011